Miss France is a French beauty pageant that has been held annually since 1947.

Titleholders 
The Miss France competition was founded in 1920, using the name La plus belle femme de France. After two editions, the competition was abandoned, and later rebranded as Miss France in 1927. Miss France was held annually until 1940, due to World War II, and has since been held annually again since 1947.

Gallery

Winners by region

Notes

References 

Miss France titleholders
Miss France titleholders
Miss France titleholders